Love It or List It Australia is an Australian TV series, based on the Canadian program of the same name, which began airing on LifeStyle on 27 September 2017. The series is hosted by Andrew Winter (Selling Houses Australia) and Neale Whitaker (The Block; Editor of Vogue Living). It is produced exclusively for Foxtel by Beyond Productions.

In October 2017, the series was renewed for a second season. The second season premiered on 26 September 2018. Although a renewal wasn't announced, the third season will return on 25 September 2019. The fourth season was set to air in 2020, halfway through filming however the season was put on hold due to COVID-19, but by October 2020 has since resumed and premiered on 29 September 2021.

Format

The series follows home owners across the country who are struggling whether to renovate and love the home they are in; or to sell up and find a new dream home somewhere else.

Real estate agent Andrew Winter and Interior designer Neale Whitaker tour the couple's home before meeting with them. The tour usually consists of Andrew finding mostly negative things to say about the residence while Neale is convinced that he can work magic with whatever plans he is given.

At the meetup between the couple and the hosts of the show, both Andrew and Neale are briefed as to what the couple's desires are. Andrew is tasked with searching for a new home for the couple in their desired location that both meets their needs and stays within their desired budget. Meanwhile, Neale is briefed on what the couples would like to see in their current house and his budget for the entire project.

Andrew will find three potential homes for the owners to look through, at each he shows them how the house meets their needs. At the end of each house visit he tells the homeowners the price of the house.

After Neale’s renovation is complete, the homeowners are given a tour of their current home to see what renovations he was able to accomplish. After the tour, Andrew meets with the homeowners and tells them an evaluation of the home's current market value following the renovations. He will then remind the couple what they could have in one of the new homes they looked at and that they would not get that in their current home.

After a moment to deliberate, Andrew & Neale pose a question to the homeowners. They must choose to either Love It, meaning that they will continue to live in their current home with the renovations, or to List It, meaning that they will buy one of the homes Andrew showed them and sell their current home. After they reveal their decision, the homeowners explain their reasoning to Andrew & Neale.

Hosts

Andrew Winter - A residential property expert and Lifestyle’s multiple award-winning television host of Selling Houses Australia. He may be known as a TV property guru but with more than 25 years experience in the global property market he really is an expert in his field. From rural to urban, historic to brand new, slow to buzzing markets Andrew has experienced them all.

Neale Whitaker - He has a wealth of design knowledge and expertise that comes courtesy of a successful publishing career as 8-years of Editor-in-chief of Belle magazine. Currently Editor-at-large at Vogue Living, Neale's frank honesty, warm humour and British eccentricities have charmed audiences in his role of expert judge on The Block.

Series overview

Episodes

Season 1 (2017)

Season 2 (2018)

Season 3 (2019)

Season 4 (2021)

References 

2017 Australian television series debuts
2010s Australian reality television series
2020s Australian reality television series
Australian television series based on non-Australian television series
Television series by Beyond Television Productions
Lifestyle (Australian TV channel) original programming